Gathaithi is a settlement in Githunguri Constituency Kiambu county  Kenya's Central Province. Gathaithi like other villages of Githunguri is known to produce milk and high quality tea.

References 

Populated places in Central Province (Kenya)